The 12th Indian Infantry Brigade was an infantry brigade at the outbreak of the Indian Army during World War II.  It was sent to Singapore in August 1939 and took part in the Malayan Campaign before going into captivity with the Fall of Singapore in February 1942.

History
The 12th Indian Infantry Brigade was one of the regular units based in Malaya before the Japanese invasion in December 1941. During the Battle of Malaya which ended with the surrender of a British Army at Singapore in February 1942, the 12th Brigade performed better than most units. One of its units, 2nd Bn, Argyll and Sutherland Highlanders, was considered to be the best jungle fighters at the time and the Argylls' commander, Lt.Col. Ian Stewart, one of the better leaders during the campaign. The brigade were among the first troops to face the Japanese when they landed on 7 December 1941 (See Japanese Invasion of Malaya).

While the rest of the British and Indian forces were thrown in disarray by the rapid encircling and flanking attacks of the Japanese, the 12th Brigade under Brigadier Archie Paris, was able to inflict casualties and slow down the Japanese forces during the fighting in Northern Malaya.

Order of battle

December 1941
5th Battalion, 2nd Punjab Regiment - Lt. Col. Charles Cecil Deakin
4th Battalion, 19th Hyderabad Regiment - Lt. Col. E.L.Wilson-Haffenden
2nd Battalion, Argyll and Sutherland Highlanders - Lt. Col. Ian MacAlister Stewart
15th Field Company S&M
122nd Field Regiment RA - Lieut. Col. George St.John Armitage Dyson

Battle of Slim River
5th Battalion, 2nd Punjab Regiment
4th Battalion, 19th Hyderabad Regiment
2nd Battalion, Argyll and Sutherland Highlanders
5th Battalion, 14th Punjab Regiment
15th Field Company S&M
137th Field Regiment RA

Commanders
Brig. Archibald Paris
Lt. Col. Ian Stewart

See also

 :List of Indian Army Brigades in World War II

References

Bibliography

External links
 
 OOD - Singapore Fortress
 Battle of Slim River
 2nd Argylls during Malayan Campaign

Brigades of India in World War II
Military units and formations disestablished in 1942
Br